A transition metal carbene complex is an organometallic compound featuring a divalent organic ligand. The divalent organic ligand coordinated to the metal center is called a carbene. Carbene complexes for almost all transition metals have been reported. Many methods for synthesizing them and reactions utilizing them have been reported. The term carbene ligand is a formalism since many are not derived from carbenes and almost none exhibit the reactivity characteristic of carbenes. They feature in some catalytic reactions, especially alkene metathesis, and are of value in the preparation of some fine chemicals.

Classification 
Metal carbene complexes are often classified into two types. The Fischer carbenes named after Ernst Otto Fischer feature strong π-acceptors at the metal and being electrophilic at the carbene carbon atom. Schrock carbenes, named after Richard R. Schrock, are characterized by more nucleophilic carbene carbon centers; these species typically feature higher valent metals. N-Heterocyclic carbenes (NHCs) were popularized following Arduengo's isolation of a stable free carbene in 1991. Reflecting the growth of the area, carbene complexes are now known with a broad range of different reactivities and diverse substituents. Often it is not possible to classify a carbene complex with regards to its electrophilicity or nucleophilicity.

Fischer carbenes

Fischer carbenes are found with:
 low oxidation state metal center
 middle and late transition metals Fe(0), Mo(0), Cr(0)
 π-acceptor metal ligands
 π-donor substituents on the carbene atom such as alkoxy and alkylated amino groups.

The chemical bonding (Scheme 1) is based on σ-type electron donation of the filled lone pair orbital of the carbene C atom to an empty metal d-orbital, and π back bonding of a filled metal d-orbital to the empty p-orbital on the carbon atom. An example is the complex .

Fischer carbenes can be likened to ketones, with the carbene carbon atom being electrophilic, much like the carbonyl carbon atom of a ketone. Like ketones, Fischer carbene species can undergo aldol-like reactions. The hydrogen atoms attached to the carbon atom α to the carbene carbon atom are acidic, and can be deprotonated by a base such as n-butyllithium, to give a nucleophile, which can undergo further reaction.

This carbene is the starting material for other reactions such as the Wulff-Dötz reaction.

Schrock carbenes
Schrock carbenes do not have π-accepting ligands. These complexes are nucleophilic at the carbene carbon atom. Schrock carbenes are typically found with:
 high oxidation state metal center
 early transition metals Ti(IV), Ta(V)
 π-donor ligands
 hydrogen and alkyl substituents on carbenoid carbon.

Bonding in such complexes can be viewed as the coupling of a triplet state metal and triplet carbene. These bonds are polarized towards carbon and therefore the carbene atom is a nucleophile. An example of a Schrock carbene is the compound , with a tantalum(V) center doubly bonded to a neopentylidene ligand as well as three neopentyl ligands. An example of interest in organic synthesis is Tebbe's reagent.

N-Heterocyclic carbenes

N-Heterocyclic carbenes (NHCs) are particularly common carbene ligands. They are popular because they are more readily prepared than Schrock and Fischer carbenes. In fact many NHCs are isolated as the free ligand, since they are persistent carbenes. Being strongly stabilized by π-donating substituents, NHCs are powerful σ-donors but π-bonding with the metal is weak. For this reason, the bond between the carbon and the metal center is often represented by a single dative bond, whereas Fischer and Schrock carbenes are usually depicted with double bonds to metal. Continuing with this analogy, NHCs are often compared with trialkylphosphine ligands. Like phosphines, NHCs serve as spectator ligands that influence catalysis through a combination of electronic and steric effects, but they do not directly bind substrates. Carbenes without a metal ligand have been produced in the lab.

Carbene radicals
Carbene radicals are long-lived reaction intermediates found with:

 low oxidation state metal center with singly occupied dz2 orbital
 middle and late transition metal, e.g. Co(II)
 σ-donor and π-acceptor ligand
 π-acceptor substituents on the ligand such as carbonyl or sulfonyl groups.  The chemical bond present in carbene radicals is described as aspects of both Fischer and Schrock carbenes.

Applications of carbene complexes
The main applications of metal carbenes involves none of the above classes of compounds, but rather heterogeneous catalysts used for alkene metathesis in the Shell higher olefin process. A variety of related reactions are used to interconvert light alkenes, e.g. butenes, propylene, and ethylene. Carbene-complexes are invoked as intermediates in the Fischer–Tropsch route to hydrocarbons. A variety of soluble carbene reagents, especially the Grubbs' and molybdenum-imido catalysts have been applied to laboratory-scale synthesis of natural products and materials science. In the nucleophilic abstraction reaction, a methyl group can be abstracted from a Fischer carbene for further reaction.

Diazo compounds like methyl phenyldiazoacetate can be used for cyclopropanation or to insert into C-H bonds of organic substrates.  These reactions are catalyzed by dirhodium tetraacetate or related chiral derivatives.  Such catalysis is assumed to proceed via the intermediacy of carbene complexes.

History

Ernst Otto Fischer, for this and other achievements in organometalic chemistry, was awarded the 1973 Nobel Prize in Chemistry.

See also 
 Carbene radical
 Carbyne
 Transition metal carbyne complex

References 

Organometallic chemistry
Carbenes
Transition metals
Coordination chemistry